Cameron Luciano Jacobs (born 31 October 1989) is a South African rugby player.

External links

itsrugby.co.uk profile

Living people
1989 births
South African rugby union players
Cheetahs (rugby union) players
Free State Cheetahs players
Griffons (rugby union) players
Rugby union players from Port Elizabeth
Rugby union wings